Mohsen Moeini (born 27 March 1979) is an Iranian author and director. His work mainly centers around his philosophical and historical preoccupations. As well as directing his own plays, he has directed plays by foreign authors such as Peter Handke and Rainer Werner Fassbinder whose works he staged in Iran for the first time. He has directed the first play to be staged in the Milad Tower.

Works

TV series (as writer and director) 
 2016 Heights Underneath, seven-episode teleplay, channel 4
 2014 Utrush, 13-episode teleplay,

Theatre

Plays (as writer and director)
 2011 Tenth Mind, Nazerzadeh Hall, Iranshahr theater
 2013 Turandot, adapted from Puccini's opera and Nezami's story, Niavaran Cultural Center
 2014 On the Fast Horse, Milad Tower, Tehran
 2014 A Thousand Mirrors, Milad Tower, Tehran
 2015 The Chant of Gabriel's Wing, Andisheh Hall
 2016 Lion in Chains, Andisheh Hall

Plays (as director)
 2012 The Actor and His Wife, starring Ali Nassirian and Mahboobeh Bayat, Niavaran Cultural Center
 2012 Dozing-off, starring Ali Nassirian and Mahboobeh Bayat, Niavaran Cultural Center
 2015 Kaspar, a play by Peter Handke, translator and director, Av theater (Da)
 2017 Blood on the Cat's Neck, translator and director, Baran theater

Book 
 2005 Hermeneutics and drama

Actors
 Ali Nasirian
 Mahbobeh Bayat
 Farokh Nemati
 Hassan Joharchi
 Kazem Efrandnia
 Mehdi Faghih
 Pardis Afkari 
 Kamran Tafti
 Ardalan Shoja Kaveh
 Leila Boloukat

See also
Iranian cinema
Iranian modern and contemporary art
Persian theatre

References

 

1979 births
21st-century dramatists and playwrights
Iranian dramatists and playwrights
Iranian film directors
Iranian scholars
Iranian screenwriters
Iranian theatre directors
Living people
People from Tehran
Persian-language film directors
Persian-language writers
Postmodern writers
Iranian contemporary artists
21st-century screenwriters